East Orchard Castle is a ruined building near St Athan in the Vale of Glamorgan, Wales, whose remains date mainly from the 14th century.

While it is called a castle, it was not fortified in the style of one and is officially classed as post-medieval and broadly defined as a domestic manor house dwelling. The historic site in its entirety contains a manor house, a barn, a chapel and a dovecote. It was destroyed by Llywelyn Bren, probably during the revolt of 1316.

The Orchards were built by the Berkerolles family, who received the land from Robert Fitzhammon after the conquest of Glamorgan 1091.

It has been in ruins since the late 18th century, the house having been dismantled from 1756.

The Royal Commission on the Ancient and Historical Monuments of Wales have a number of drawings of East Orchard Castle.

It is located on the eastern boundary of the St Athan community, approximately 1100 metres east of the Church of St Athan on the low cliff on the west side of the River Thaw, and is generally accessed by the lands of Rock Farm. There is a small stone bridge over a run-off of the river thaw that is likely related to the build of the castle (see image below).

Literature

References

Castle ruins in Wales
Grade II listed castles in Wales